Lucha VaVOOM is a lucha libre and Burlesque professional wrestling promotion based in Los Angeles, California. Founded in 2003.

Gallery

See also
 Exótico

References

External links

 

Professional wrestling in Los Angeles
Lucha libre
2003 establishments in California
Burlesque
Independent professional wrestling promotions based in California
Culture of Los Angeles